Siti Chamamah Soeratno is a female Islamic scholar from Indonesia and the former leader of Aisyiyah, Indonesia's first all-female Muslim organization. She is also the former dean of Muhammadiyah University of Malang and an expert on Indonesian literature. She has served as a faculty member at Leiden University, Mercu Buana University, Sebelas Maret University and Yogyakarta State University among others.

Soeratno's involvement with Islamic organizations began early in her life. She attended a Muhammadiyah high school and became the chairwoman of Aisyiyah's youth wing in 1965. She is a proponent of the Islamization of knowledge, promoting the view that the adjective "Islamic" should refer more than to strictly religious practices and should include all aspects of life and referring to democracy, equality, justice and the human norms of liberty as "Islamic values."

References

Female Islamic religious leaders
Indonesian Islamic religious leaders
Indonesian Sunni Muslims
Living people
Sunni Muslim scholars of Islam
Women scholars of Islam
1941 births
People from Yogyakarta
Academic staff of Yogyakarta State University